is a Japanese manga series written and illustrated by Ryotaro Iwanaga. Originally serialized in Magazine GREAT in 2002 it was later moved to Monthly Shonen Magazine in October 2006. The manga has been licensed by Del Rey. An anime adaptation of Pumpkin Scissors has been released, produced by Gonzo and AIC, which began airing on October 2, 2006 across several Japanese television stations and ended with the 24th episode on March 19, 2007. The series was originally licensed to the North American market by ADV Films for $780,000. In 2008 it became one of over thirty titles transferred from ADV Films to Funimation.

Plot
Set in a region strongly resembling Western Europe, where technology is at best mid-1930s (tanks exist, but semi-automatic rifles have just been developed, the main transport vehicle is still the train or the car, planes are seldom used, wireless communication doesn't exist, etc.) in which a catastrophic war has just ended similar to that of the Great War (which in this universe lasts for 11 years) that occurred in the early parts of the 20th century, the Royal Empire (which is culturally similar to the German Empire, but still with a few traditions dating back the Middle Ages) and the Republic of Frost have declared a ceasefire to end the war indefinitely. The Empire is plagued by starvation, and pestilence, with former soldiers turning to thievery, banditry and other forms of crime, forming into gangs to survive the post-war period. Three years later, to aid the people of the Empire in the war relief effort, the Imperial Army State Section III, also known as the Pumpkin Scissors unit, is established.

The name for the group was an idea from one of its officers, the 2nd Lieutenant Alice L. Malvin. According to her, in their war relief effort, they must "face the threat of corrupt people who protect themselves behind lies, power, and money like the rind of a pumpkin", and Section III must act like a pair of scissors cutting through those layers and delivering justice for the people. This is a constant message which ripples throughout the series. The unit is, however, berated constantly, considered a propaganda tool used by the government, and is seen as an insult to the war relief effort by many within the army, as well as the Empire's citizens. Randel Oland, a veteran soldier with a mysterious past, joins their ranks and steadily the Pumpkin Scissors unit begins to be taken more seriously as the plot begins to unravel.

Characters

 2nd Lieutenant Alice L. Malvin
 
 Second in command and field leader of the Pumpkin Scissors. An inexperienced soldier of noble origin who graduated in the academy just before the ceasefire (the ceasefire was announced literally in the middle of the graduation ceremony for the class of officers she was in at military academy); Alice's hot-tempered and reckless demeanor tends to sometimes put her and her subordinates in danger. She has a strong sense of duty and justice and tries to live up to her family's military traditions, contrary to her father and sisters' belief that she must assume a more feminine behavior. While she is the current heir to her family, she will likely lose this position once her younger brother comes of age.
 Contrary to her subordinates who always engage in combat with firearms, Alice's weapon of choice is a short-sword with her family crest engraved on it, but in some occasions she shows her true skills in battle when brandishing her special weapon, a long double-bladed cavalry sword called Mahne. Another curious trait of hers is that sometimes she feels chills on her neck when something very good or very bad is about to happen. Alice is engaged to another noble, Lionel Taylor, who apparently supports her ideals.
 Corporal Randel Oland
 
 A retired soldier who joined the Pumpkin Scissors to aid in their war relief effort. He was part of the secret 901 anti-tank-trooper unit, which basically consisted of foot soldiers trained to take down enemy tanks by themselves. This unit, known also as the "Gespenster Jäger" (German for "Ghost Hunter") was part of the "Invisible 9". They are specially trained to ignore pain and fear in order to engage tanks and armored vehicles at point blank range. While the division was secret, all tank crews were warned to be wary of soldiers carrying a blue lantern.
 Despite his impressive stature (probably over seven feet), and a body riddled with scars, Randel's nature most of the time is kindhearted and ingenuous. But when he is in trouble he turns on his blue-steel lantern marked "901-ATT", and he becomes a fearless and vicious combatant. He is capable of defeating even heavily armored foes with his 13 mm anti-tank pistol, known as the "door knocker" (highly reminiscent of a Thompson/Center Contender pistol), and is later shown to use another weapon, which is a giant pair of shears—flashbacks showed it to be used to rip apart the metal plating armor of tanks to get to the pilot crews.
 Due to his reckless style of combat brought on from his conditioning/training to ignore pain and fear, Randel is frequently hospitalized during the series. These hospital stays lead to a running gag about the size of the corporal's penis, and the inability of the hospital nurse to find a urine container that will not break.
 Captain Hunks
 
 The commanding officer and administrator of the Pumpkin Scissors. He issues mission orders and provides a calm, steadying presence, which balances Lieutenant Malvin's impetuous nature. His personality is relaxed and informal.
 Warrant Officer Martis
 
 Graduated as one of the top students of the academy, the slight, bespectacled Martis provides the voice of reason and caution when out in the field. It is also hinted from one of the episodes that he knows very good defensive-based martial arts.
 Warrant Officer Oreldo
 
 Childhood friend of Martis, Oreldo is a handsome young soldier who fancies himself a ladies' man, yet seems to be something of a player. He is very clever, resourceful and an expert at picking locks. His background has yet to be fully explained, but he seemed to be a street urchin before joining the military.
 Sergeant Major Lili Stecchin
 
 She is the longest serving member of the "Pumpkin Scissors" unit. Little is known about her past except that she was a part of the military band in her previous post. She serves as Captain Hunks' aide and is also responsible for taking care of Mercury. She is elated to no end that with the recruitment of Randel into their unit, she finally outranks someone (other than the messenger-dog, Mercury) and has "an underling!"  It is also noted in the anime filler episode that she loves children and wants to be a good mother one day.
 Mercury
 
 Often referred to as "Merc" (Mer-kun in the Japanese version). The platoon's messenger-dog, who has a bad habit of biting peoples' heads. He was demoted from Corporal to Courier Private First Class for biting an officer in Episode 1. He is very fast, reliable and sensitive to the emotions of his team. Their reaction to a particularly unpleasant officer (Major Connery) lead to the previously mentioned incident. He resembles a Labrador Retriever.
 While Merc is normally seen as a friendly dog with the members of Section III, when events warrant it, he shows himself to be what the commoners referred to as a "military hound," and can even disarm opponents.
 First Lieutenant Webner
 
 The officer in charge of the technology development unit of the army intelligence bureau.
 Lionel Taylor
 
 The noble fiancé of Alice.  A tall and smooth talking gentleman who is well aware of the corruption and madness that is running through the nobles, as well as Alice's love for the military.  He has been known to give Section 3 tips on matters, though he seems to have more sinister purposes up his sleeve.
 Major Connery
 
 The commanding officer for Section I of the Army Intelligence bureau. Compared to Captain Hunks, his personality is cold-hearted. However, along with Captain Hunks, he also seems to know about the secrets kept within the army. He often complains to Captain Hunks about Section III interfering with his operations, but usually backs down eventually.
 Wolmarf
 
 The first minor antagonist of the series. He was a leader of a Chemical Tactics Trooper (CTT) squad. Oland killed him with his "door knocker".  As a bandit, he called himself Grauwolfe or Wolfe after his unit's code name, 903-CTT, one of the Invisible 9, a secret and illegal unit created by the Empire for the war, specialized in chemical warfare. It is actually revealed in the manga that the main reason he turned rogue was because, after his captain was killed, he found out that their unit (at the end of the war, thus no longer needed), was considered to be composed of war criminals by the military, since in international treaties already forbade the use of chemical weapons before the war, thus taking all the blame of the military with them.
 Hans
 
 A High Temperature Trooper (HTT) who is indebted to the secret organization "Silver Wheel". As HT Troopers he and his unit members were given a flame thrower and a protective suit. The suit however did not protect against the flames, a fact the Kauplan Institute covered up by filling the suits with a fluid impregnated with analgesics, which kept the men from feeling the harm they did to their body and also prevent the skin to take damage from being in an enclosed environment for weeks, months or even years. After the cease-fire, Hans's fellow soldiers, ignorant of their life-threatening burns, took off their suits and perished. Hans was lost in thought and thus delayed in removing his own. His dying team members told him to keep that suit on, because if he too removed it he would die just like them. Hans spent the years since the cease-fire inside it.

Media

Manga 
Pumpkin Scissors was originally serialized in Magazine GREAT in 2002, but later moved to Monthly Shōnen Magazine in October 2006 where it is still serialized as of 2018. The manga was licensed by Del Rey as announced at the New York Comic Convention 2007. Del Rey published the first five volumes before it closed down. It is currently being published in English by Kodansha USA, a subsidiary of the Japanese publisher Kodansha. The most recent Japanese release, Volume 23, became available on November 15, 2019.

Anime 

The 24-episode anime adaptation was animated by Gonzo and AIC and produced by Geneon. It aired on Tokyo MX between October 2, 2006 and March 17, 2007. It was licensed by ADV Films and dubbed by its in-house studio then re-licensed by Funimation following ADV's closing in 2009. The show also aired in English on Animax Asia from May 21, 2010 to June 23, 2010 with a locally produced dub.

Reception 

The English edition of the first volume of Pumpkin Scissors was named by the Young Adult Library Services Association as among the best graphic novels for teens for 2007.

The anime adaptation has received a mixed response from Anime News Network and The Escapist.  Most of the criticism is directed at the lack of focus the series has for its story arcs and an ending that leaves the series incomplete.  Theron Martin from Anime News Network did give some praise when going over the remaining four episodes of the anime, pointing out individual character moments, particularly Alice's duel, but criticized the series overall for dragging out the plot.   The Escapist concluded their review by stating that "Had Pumpkin Scissors focused on fully developing at least one aspect of the story, it might have been a good series. As it stands, it feels unfinished with only a few interesting bits to spare from being totally forgettable."

See also 
 Armor Hunter Mellowlink—Another anime series about an infantry anti-armor unit

References

Further reading

External links 
 Funimation's Pumpkin Scissors website
 

2002 manga
Action anime and manga
ADV Films
Alternate history anime
Anime International Company
Del Rey Manga
Funimation
Gonzo (company)
Kodansha manga
Military anime and manga
Shōnen manga